Braiswick, also referred to as New Braiswick Park is a village in Essex, England, 2 km northwest of Colchester. Development of Braiswick begun in 2007 and was eventually completed in 2011.

History
In the late 13th century, Braiswick and surrounding settlements were often referred to as Myland. In the middle-ages, settlements seemed to have been scattered over the un-wooded areas of the region including Tubswick, recorded from 1295, and Braiswick seems to have originated as a medieval freehold.

References

External links
 Community Website to oppose overdevelopment of Myland & Braiswick
 Myland Parish Church - History of New Braiswick Park

Villages in Essex
Borough of Colchester